Bayou Cocodrie National Wildlife Refuge was established in 1992 to preserve waterfowl habitat and hardwood forest of the lower Mississippi river. It is named for the state-designated scenic river of Bayou Cocodrie.

The Nature Conservancy purchased an  core tract in 1991 from the Fisher Lumber Company, a subsidiary of General Motors Corporation. The Conservancy then sold the land to the US Fish and Wildlife Service over a span of five years.

The bottomland hardwoods at Bayou Cocodrie have been noted as some of the last remaining, least disturbed timber of what historically was once a vast hardwood forest along the Mississippi River from Illinois to Louisiana.

Flora and fauna
The majority of the refuge is hardwood forest of oak, gum, and ash. A  site of hardwood is designated a natural resource area for study purposes. The remaining habitat is wetlands utilized by wintering waterfowl such as mallard, pintail and shoveler duck species. The wood duck is found in the refuge and is one of the reasons for the establishment of the Bayou Cocodrie National Wildlife Refuge. Other birds include bald eagle, peregrine falcon, osprey and Swainson's warbler. At least 186 bird species have been identified in the refuge.

The Louisiana black bear, federally listed as threatened since 1992, is known to occur in the Bayou Cocodrie. The historic range of the Louisiana black bear included southern Louisiana, Mississippi and east Texas, and is a subspecies of the American black bear.

See also
List of National Wildlife Refuges: Louisiana

Notes

References

External links
 Bayou Cocodrie National Wildlife Refuge - official site

Protected areas of Concordia Parish, Louisiana
National Wildlife Refuges in Louisiana
Protected areas established in 1992
Wetlands and bayous of Louisiana
Landforms of Concordia Parish, Louisiana